Malakal Airport  is an airport serving Malakal, a city in Malakal County in the Eastern Nile state of South Sudan. The airport is located just north of the city's central business district, adjacent to the main campus of Upper Nile University. Malakal is near the international border with the Republic of Sudan and the border with Ethiopia.

Malakal is the smaller of two international airports in South Sudan.

As part of the United Nations Mission in Sudan (UNMIS), the airport was a major staging point for United Nation operations to South Sudan and will continue to do so under the new United Nations Mission in South Sudan (UNMISS) mandate.

Facilities

Scheduled airlines and destinations

The following airlines maintain scheduled service at Malakal Airport to the following destinations:

See also
 Malakal
 Upper Nile State
 Greater Upper Nile
 List of airports in South Sudan

References

External links
 Photo of Malakal Airport In 2011
 Photo of Malakal Airport In 2007
 
  Location of Malakal Airport At Google Maps

Airports in South Sudan
Malakal
Upper Nile (state)
Greater Upper Nile